The hat operator is a mathematical notation with various uses in different branches of science and mathematics.

Estimated value
In statistics, a circumflex (ˆ), called a "hat", is used to denote an estimator or an estimated value. For example, in the context of errors and residuals, the "hat" over the letter ε indicates an observable estimate (the residuals) of an unobservable quantity called ε (the statistical errors).

Hat matrix

In statistics, the hat matrix H projects the observed values y of response variable to the predicted values ŷ:

Cross product
In screw theory, one use of the hat operator is to represent the cross product operation.  Since the cross product is a linear transformation, it can be represented as a matrix.  The hat operator takes a vector and transforms it into its equivalent matrix.

For example, in three dimensions,

Unit vector

In mathematics, a unit vector in a normed vector space is a vector (often a spatial vector) of length 1.

Fourier transform 

See also
 Exterior algebra
 Top-hat filter
 Circumflex, noting that precomposed glyphs [letter-with-circumflex] do not exist for all letters.

References

Mathematical notation